Jonathan Gilbert may refer to:

 Jonathan Gilbert (born 1967), U.S. television and film actor
 Jonathan Gilbert (diplomat) (born 1977), Australian diplomat

See also
 Jonathan (disambiguation)
 Gilbert (disambiguation)